Truganina railway station is a proposed railway station on the Deer Park-West Werribee railway line, first proposed in the Truganina Precinct Structure Plan in September, 2014. It is being built to serve the high amount of development occurring nearby in new areas such as Albright Estate, Elements Estate and Ellarook Estate.

References

Proposed railway stations in Melbourne